In enzymology, a long-chain-fatty-acid—[acyl-carrier-protein] ligase is an enzyme that catalyzes the chemical reaction

ATP + an acid + [acyl-carrier-protein]  AMP + diphosphate + acyl-[acyl-carrier-protein]

The 3 substrates of this enzyme are ATP, acid, and acyl-carrier-protein, whereas its 3 products are AMP, diphosphate, and [[acyl-[acyl-carrier-protein]]].

This enzyme belongs to the family of ligases, specifically those forming carbon-sulfur bonds as acid-thiol ligases.  The systematic name of this enzyme class is long-chain-fatty-acid:[acyl-carrier-protein] ligase (AMP-forming). Other names in common use include acyl-[acyl-carrier-protein] synthetase, acyl-[acyl carrier protein] synthetase, acyl-ACP synthetase, acyl-[acyl-carrier-protein]synthetase, stearoyl-ACP synthetase, and acyl-acyl carrier protein synthetase.  This enzyme participates in fatty acid metabolism.

References

 

EC 6.2.1
Enzymes of unknown structure